South Fork Township is a township in Delaware County, Iowa, USA.  As of the 2000 census, its population was 1,228.

Geography
South Fork Township covers an area of 41.82 square miles (108.32 square kilometers). The streams of Bell Creek and Sand Creek run through this township.

Cities and towns
 Hopkinton

Unincorporated towns
 Sand Springs
(This list is based on USGS data and may include former settlements.)

Adjacent townships
 North Fork Township (north)
 Dodge Township, Dubuque County (northeast)
 Cascade Township, Dubuque County (east)
 Richland Township, Jones County (southeast)
 Lovell Township, Jones County (south)
 Castle Grove Township, Jones County (southwest)
 Union Township (west)
 Delhi Township (northwest)

Cemeteries
The township contains five cemeteries: Hopkinton, Livingston, Mount Pleasant, Sand Springs and Willard.

Major highways

References
 U.S. Board on Geographic Names (GNIS)
 United States Census Bureau cartographic boundary files

External links
 US-Counties.com
 City-Data.com

Townships in Delaware County, Iowa
Townships in Iowa